Garcia is Grateful Dead guitarist Jerry Garcia's first solo album, released in 1972.

Warner Bros. Records offered the Grateful Dead the opportunity to cut their own solo records, and Garcia was  released around the same time as Bob Weir's Ace and Mickey Hart's Rolling Thunder. Unlike Ace, which was practically a Grateful Dead album, Garcia was more of a solo effort, as Garcia played almost all the instrumental parts.  Six tracks (specifically those coauthored by lyricist Robert Hunter) eventually became standards in the Grateful Dead concert repertoire.

Some reprints of the album are self-released. "Loser" was covered by Cracker on their 1993 album Kerosene Hat.

Track listing

Side one
"Deal" (Robert Hunter, Jerry Garcia) – 3:14
"Bird Song" (Hunter, Garcia) – 4:26
"Sugaree" (Hunter, Garcia) – 5:54
"Loser" (Hunter, Garcia) – 4:10

Side two
"Late for Supper" (Garcia, Bill Kreutzmann) – 1:37
"Spidergawd" (Garcia, Kreutzmann) – 3:25
"Eep Hour" (Garcia, Kreutzmann) – 5:08
"To Lay Me Down" (Hunter, Garcia) – 6:18
"An Odd Little Place" (Garcia, Kreutzmann) – 1:38
"The Wheel" (Hunter, Garcia, Kreutzmann) – 4:12

The album was reissued in the All Good Things: Jerry Garcia Studio Sessions box set with the following bonus tracks:
11. "Sugaree" (Alternate Take) (Hunter, Garcia) – 7:13
12. "Loser" (Alternate Take) (Hunter, Garcia) – 4:06
13. "Late For Supper / Spidergawd / Eep Hour" (Alternate Takes) (Garcia, Kreutzmann)
14. "The Wheel" (Alternate Take #1) (Hunter, Garcia) – 4:04
15. "The Wheel" (Alternate Take #2) (Hunter, Garcia) – 2:53
16. "Study for EEP Hour" (Garcia, Kreutzmann) – 3:30
17. "Dealin' from the Bottom" (Studio Jam) (Garcia, Kreutzmann) – 1:25
18. "Study for the Wheel" (Garcia, Kreutzmann) – 3:22

A vinyl pressing (GDV 4003) was made in West Germany for Grateful Dead Records (48-50 Steele Road, London NW10 7AS) and released in 1988. The tracks are the same as the 1972 original. Inexplicably, the labels on the vinyl record itself read "Grateful Dead - The Wheel" at the top, with "Jerry Garcia" appearing as a subheading at the bottom, below the track lists.

Personnel

Musicians
Jerry Garcia – acoustic guitar, electric guitar, pedal steel guitar, bass, piano, organ, samples, vocals, mixing
Bill Kreutzmann – drums

Production
Bob Matthews – producer, engineer, mixing
Betty Cantor – producer, engineer, mixing
Ramrod – producer, engineer, mixing, production assistant
Bill Kreutzmann – production assistant
Bob Seidemann – cover photo and album design
Herb Greene – Garcia photo

References

Jerry Garcia albums
1972 debut albums
Warner Records albums